Kim Suzanne Engelbrecht (born 20 June 1980) is a South African actress. She is the recipient of two South African Film and Television Awards as well as a nomination for an International Emmy Award.

She is known for her roles as Lolly in the soap opera Isidingo, Sgt. Noma Banks on the Syfy series Dominion (2014–2015), Marlize DeVoe on The CW show The Flash (2017–2018), and the titular character in Reyka (2021).

Career
Engelbrecht presented a local youth television programme called Take5 in the 1990s. Much of Engelbrecht's work is localised in Johannesburg. Kim had a starring role in the South African film Bunny Chow, directed by John Barker.

She got her first big break at the age of 12 when she landed the lead role of Sara in an Italian production, Sarahsara, in which she played the role of a 12-year-old girl of Sudanese descent who swims from the Isle of Capri to Napoli in Italy.

Engelbrecht starred as Marlize DeVoe in the fourth season (2017–2018) of The Flash. In an interview with Kyle Zeeman of the Sunday Times, she said: "It was amazing working with actors like Grant Gustin (who plays The Flash) and Neil Sandilands, who is also a South African. I am coming into a show that is the biggest on its network and is already on its fourth season. It has a huge fan base and that comes with a huge amount of pressure. I understand that it is a big show. That it is a big deal (for South Africa) and I just really want to do well"

Filmography

Film

Television

Awards and nominations

References

External links
 
 

Living people
1980 births
21st-century South African actresses
Actresses from Cape Town
South African film actresses
South African television actresses